Going Under (also known as Dive!) is a 1991 American comedy film starring Bill Pullman, Wendy Schaal, Chris Demetral, Tyrone Granderson Jones, Dennis Redfield, Lou Richards, Ernie Sabella, Elmarie Wendel, Ned Beatty, Robert Vaughn, and Roddy McDowall. The film was directed by Mark W. Travis and written by Randolph Davis and Darryl Zarubica.

Plot
An American submarine races to get a nuclear weapon before a Russian submarine.

Cast

 Bill Pullman as Biff Banner
 Wendy Schaal as Jan Michaels
 Chris Demetral as Apple
 Tyrone Granderson Jones as Quizby
 Dennis Redfield as Turbo
 Lou Richards as Skiff
 Ernie Sabella as The Mole
 Elmarie Wendel as Sonar
 Ned Beatty as Admiral Malice
 Robert Vaughn as Wedgewood
 Roddy McDowall as Secretary Neighbor
 Richard Masur as Defense Contractor
 John Moschitta as Defense Contractor
 Joe Namath as Captain Joe Namath
 Rif Hutton as Dr. Friendly
 Michael Winslow as Reporter
 Dianne Turley Travis as Secretary to Wedgewood
 Shawne Zarubica aa Tour Guide
 Frank Bonner as Soviet General
 Andrea Stein as Soviet General
 Artur Cybulski as Soviet Captain
 Ivan G'Vera as Soviet Sonar Man
 Darryl Zarubica as Soviet Sub Technician
 Tad Horino as Japanese Captain
 Dayton Callie as General Confusion
 Richard Carlyle as General Air Quality
 Bill DeLand as General Alert
 Hal England as General Telephone
 Tom Fuccello as General Leegood
 William A. Porter as General Electric
 Tom Dahlgren as U.S. Admiral
 Alan Toy as U.S. Tracking Technician
 Haskell V. Anderson III as Bongo Crewman
 Clayton Landey as O'Neill
 Nicholas Mele as Wimmer
 G. Smokey Campbell as Shore Patrol
 Andrew Parks as Shore Patrol
 Dean Cain as Guy in Bar
 Eddie Frierson as Guy in Bar
 Richard Kuhlman as Guy in Bar
 Joseph Hardin as Guy in Bar
 Richard Evans as Shipyard Worker
 Mark Haining as Shipyard Worker
 Ken Fording as Bartender

Production
Going Under was filmed in 1990 as Dive!.

Release
Although never released in theaters,  Going Under was released on VHS on August 23, 1991. The film can be streamed online by Amazon Video via Warner Home Video.

Reception
TV Guide gave Going Under 2 stars out of 5 stars. In Hal Erickson's book Military Comedy Films: A Critical Survey and Filmography of Hollywood Releases Since 1918, he writes: "Unlike A Man Called Sarge, Going Under actually indicates that some thought and money went into its preparation. While the production values are not lavish, they are at least up to 1990s theatrical feature standards."

See also
 List of American films of 1991
 List of comedy films of the 1990s

References

Bibliography

External links

1991 films
1991 comedy films
1990s English-language films
1990s parody films
1990s war comedy films
American parody films
American war comedy films
Cold War submarine films
Films scored by David Michael Frank
Warner Bros. films
1990s American films